PWG  may refer to:

Pro Wrestling Guerrilla, an American professional wrestling promotion based in Southern California
Communist Party of India (Marxist-Leninist) People's War, usually called People's War Group (PWG)
The Printer Working Group
PWG Raster, an image format created by the Printer Working Group
The Working Group on Financial Markets, also known as the President's Working Group on Financial Markets